J. & E. Stevens was a business in Cromwell, Connecticut formed by  John and Elisha Stevens in 1843 to make cast-iron hardware, hammers, and iron toys. The success of their toy products, including cap guns, led to a refocus on toys. The company made a wide variety of toys for boys and girls during its more than 100 year history.

The company employed many designers and produced dozens of banks. Their mechanical banks included a "Tammany" bank featuring a heavy-set dressed up politician who puts an introduced coin into his pocket (Tammany Hall). The business was bought out by Buckley Brothers, a New York company, in 1950.

One of their animated banks featuring a hunter and lion appeared on Antiques Roadshow.  The University of Connecticut has a collection of the company's papers.

References

Companies based in Connecticut
Companies established in 1843